Ventiseri is a commune in the Haute-Corse department of France on the island of Corsica.

Geography

Climate
Ventiseri has a mediterranean climate (Köppen climate classification Csa).

Population

See also
Communes of the Haute-Corse department

References

Communes of Haute-Corse